Albanians may refer to:

 in terms of ethnicity: Albanians, a people in Southeastern Europe
 in terms of citizenship: Albanians, citizens of Albania
 Caucasian Albanians, a distinctive group in the Caucasian region
 Albanians, a demonym for inhabitants of various places called Albany etc.

See also
 Albany (disambiguation)
 Albania (disambiguation)
 Albanian (disambiguation)